Peter Steinberg (born 16 May 1971) is an American rugby union coach and former player. He is the current head coach of the United States. He has previously coached the Penn State Rugby. He was born in Cambridge, United Kingdom.

Coaching career

In 1995, Steinberg moved from Assistant Coach to Head Coach for the Penn State women's rugby team, replacing Coach Charlie Smith. Steinberg built upon what Smith started, and created a college rugby dynasty at Penn State Rugby winning national championships in 1997, 2000, 2004, 2007, 2009, 2010, 2011, 2012, 2013, and 2014.

Steinberg coached the United States women's national rugby team during the 2014 Women's Rugby World Cup in Paris and in 2017 Women's Rugby World Cup in Ireland. He stepped down as Head Coach after the 2017 World Cup.

Honors
D1 College Rugby National Championship
Winner: 2007, 2009
D2 College Rugby National Championship
Winner: 2004
NASC MARFU National Championship
Winner: 2005
Sports Illustrated Face in the Crowd
Winner: 2004

References

1971 births
United States national rugby union team coaches
United States national rugby sevens team coaches
Living people
Fellows of the American Physical Society